SFC Sturmi (Georgian: სართიჭალის საფეხბურთო კლუბი შტურმი) is a Georgian football club based in the town of Sartichala. 

Being one of the youngest domestic teams, they started taking part in the fifth division of Georgian league system in 2020 and within the three years progressed to Liga 3.

History
Shturmi Sartichala was formed in early 2020 to replace FC Sarti Sartichala, dissolved in 2018, and represent the town in Regionuli Liga. Tornike Chaduneli, the former Torpedo Kutaisi defender and Sarti manager, took charge of the team.

2020: debut in Regionuli Liga

First steps
Shturmi had to patiently wait until their first game. Due to the COVID-19 pandemic, the season was suspended until August, when a single-round competition among 14 clubs of Group D East began.

The club from the very outset displayed an attacking football which greatly contributed to thrashing some rivals. By mid-season with the seven matches behind Shturmi had won five of them with a large margin and reached an astonishing 31:5 aggregate goal difference.

In mid-October the team was placed in a two-week COVID quarantine. Straight after the games were resumed, Shturmi set their own record by winning 12–0. Until the final game week the club kept beating all other opponents, although so did Dinamo-2 Tbilisi who, apart from the same winning run, had a better goal advantage. The decisive tie was supposed to determine a winner of the league group with promotion to Liga 4.

Crunch game with unexpected ending
The match on 20 December in Sartichala drew a great interest among the cheering locals who, unable to get inside the ground, gathered around it. Shturmi took the lead after ten minutes with Dinamo equalizing five minutes later. Numerous attempts to break the well-defending rivals reached a dramatic end in stoppage time when the hosts were awarded a penalty kick. However, goalkeeper Omar Migineishvili saved it and with final score 1-1 Shturmi were denied a victory.

In late January 2021, Georgian Football Federation decided to enlarge Liga 4 at the expense of all four second-placed Regionuli Liga clubs from the previous season with Shturmi being among these promoted teams.

2021-22: in Liga 4
The start in the fourth tier was less impressive. However, the team drastically improved in the second stage, won ten games, including with 7-0 and 9-0, and prevailed in the final match of the season with a 12-0 victory. 

During the 2022 season, Shturmi turned out the only team in the top four Georgian leagues with the perfect home record. This circumstance played a crucial role in successful conclusion of their league campaign. With head coach Tornike Chaduneli back at the helm, Shturmi advanced to Liga 3.

Seasons

Players
As of April 2022

(C)

Honours
• Regionuli Liga

Runners-up (1): 2020

• Liga 4

Runners-up (1): 2022

Stadium

Shturmi play home matches at Central stadium in Sartichala, which is due to undergo major reconstruction works according to an electronic tender, announced in January 2021. A 500-seater stadium is scheduled to open in February 2023. For this reason the team hosted all their Liga 4 rivals at Sagarejo football ground.

Name

SFC stands for Sartichala Football Club while Georgian word shturmi can be translated as assault.

External links
 Page on Facebook

References

Football clubs in Georgia (country)
2020 establishments in Georgia (country)
Association football clubs established in 2020